Mamulan (also Romanized as Ma‘mūlān and Māmūlūn) is a city in and capital of Mamulan District, in Pol-e Dokhtar County, Lorestan Province, Iran. At the 2006 census, its population was 7,633, in 1,725 families.

Notable people
 Ebrahim Mirzapour (Iranian football goalkeeper)

References

Towns and villages in Pol-e Dokhtar County
Cities in Lorestan Province